Justice O'Brien may refer to:

 Charles H. O'Brien, associate justice of the Tennessee Supreme Court
 Denis O'Brien (politician), judge of the New York Court of Appeals
 Henry X. O'Brien, associate justice of the Supreme Court of Pennsylvania
 John F. O'Brien (judge), chief judge of the New York Court of Appeals 
 Thomas D. O'Brien, associate justice of the Minnesota Supreme Court